Brittany Chambers (born April 3, 1991) is an American basketball player who plays professionally in Spain.  She was drafted by the Los Angeles Sparks in the 2013 WNBA Draft. On March 2, 2015, Chambers signed with the San Antonio Stars, but was released before the start of the 2015 WNBA season.

College statistics

Personal life
Chambers majored in pre-medicine at Kansas State University.

Attends A.T. Still University, Kirksville College of Osteopathic Medicine

References

External links
Kansas State Wildcats bio

1991 births
Living people
American expatriate basketball people in Spain
American women's basketball players
Basketball players from Minnesota
Guards (basketball)
Kansas State Wildcats women's basketball players
Los Angeles Sparks draft picks
People from Crosby, Minnesota
People from Jordan, Minnesota